Down With the King is a political card game for 2-6 players produced by Avalon Hill in 1981. Each player takes the role of a noble in the fictional nation of Fandonia during the European "Baroque age" (roughly 1600-1750), and by diplomacy, betrayal, and political maneuvering, attempts to depose the current monarch, and place his lackey on the throne.

The game was designed by Glenn Rahman, Kenneth Rahman, and Alan R. Moon. It is sometimes described as a "Fantasy Political Game", but has no inherently supernatural elements.

Gameplay
Each turn consists of a sequence of random events and player actions. Player actions include trying to increase their character's skills, influence, and prestige, gain the loyalty of non-player characters, political offices for characters, destabilize the current king, and interfere with other players' factions trying to do the same. Eventually, when a player feels his faction has enough power, and the current monarch is sufficiently destabilized, they may try to usurp the throne, and replace the monarch with a royal character (or pretender) under their control. A player controlling the monarch for three consecutive turns wins the game.

Besides characters, represented as cards, a player controls a certain number of Influence Points, or IPs, spent as "money" to accomplish actions, and Prestige Points, or PPs, which serve as a limit to the number of characters they can control. The player also has a set of cards and opportunity counters that restrict the actions they can take.  Actions include a vast array of options, including Dueling, Assassination, Travel Abroad, Advising the Monarch (requires an office), Escape (from abroad or hiding), Extradite a Wrongdoer (from abroad), Expose a Scandal, Intrigue (try to steal an opponent's card), Recruit a Character, Court Monarch's Favor, Fill a Vacant Office, Recruit by Treachery, Seduce a Character, Hold a Wedding, Consult Prestige Tables, and Solicit Bribes (requires an office). All these actions tend to award or take away PPs and IPs.

Reception
Paul Manz reviewed Down with the King in The Space Gamer No. 48. Manz commented that "Down with the King is a pleasant change of pace, and a very enjoyable group game."

References

External links
 
 Down with the King Fan site contains the rules and a Windows program for the game, with source code
 Down With the King - Summary Rules notes, and political parties variant

Alan R. Moon games
Avalon Hill games
Card games introduced in 1981
Dedicated deck card games